Church of the Dormition of the Theotokos in Negoslavci is Serbian Orthodox church in eastern Croatia. The church is dedicated to Dormition of the Theotokos. Beside the church is new parish house. The building and its inventory are separately listed in Register of Cultural Goods of Croatia. Construction activities have been completed in 1757.

Photo gallery

See also
Eparchy of Osječko polje and Baranja
Negoslavci
Serbs of Croatia
List of Serbian Orthodox churches in Croatia

References

Sources
 

18th-century Eastern Orthodox church buildings
Negoslavci
Churches completed in 1757
Register of Cultural Goods of the Republic of Croatia